John Hamal Hubbard (born October 6 or 7, 1945; the actual date is unknown) is an American mathematician and professor at Cornell University and the Université de Provence. He is well known for the mathematical contributions he made with Adrien Douady in the field of complex dynamics, including a study of the Mandelbrot set.  One of their most important results is that the Mandelbrot set is connected.

Background 
Hubbard graduated with a Doctorat d'État from Université de Paris-Sud in 1973 under the direction of Adrien Douady; his thesis was entitled Sur Les Sections Analytiques de La Courbe Universelle de Teichmüller and was published by the American Mathematical Society. Hubbard has a variety of mathematical interests ranging from complex analysis to differential geometry. He has written many influential papers on complex dynamics, and he has written several books.

Writing 
Hubbard is a former student of Harvard University's infamous Math 55, where he famously struggled initially because he "just didn't know proofs." He later returned to Harvard to teach that same class. However, Hubbard developed a profound distaste for Math 55's method of teaching proofs largely centered on algebraic induction. In response, he and his wife Barbara Burke Hubbard wrote the book Vector Calculus, Linear Algebra, and Differential Forms: A Unified Approach.

He has also published three volumes of a book on Teichmüller theory and its applications to four revolutionary theorems of William Thurston.

Personal life 
He is married to Barbara Burke Hubbard, a science writer. Together they have a son, Alexander, and three younger daughters, Eleanor, Judith and Diana. The children sometimes help them with their books, in illustration, writing answer keys and pointing out the minor errors.

Hubbard and his family live in Ithaca, New York.

References

External links

Cornell University faculty
University of Paris alumni
Academic staff of the University of Provence
20th-century American mathematicians
21st-century American mathematicians
Dynamical systems theorists
Mathematical analysts
1945 births
Living people
Harvard University alumni